Demorest may refer to:

Places
United States
 Demorest, Georgia — city in Habersham County

People
 Ellen Louise Demorest (née Curtis) (1825-1898) — US fashion arbiter and milliner, wife of William Jennings Demorest
 Stephen Demorest — soap opera writer
 William Jennings Demorest (1822-1895) — political leader (Prohibition Party) and magazine publisher from New York City

See also
 Demarest (disambiguation)